Fenis Bently was an American football coach.  He served as the head football coach at Central State Normal School—now the University of Central Oklahoma—from 1905 to 1911, compiling a career college football record of 22–38–5.

Head coaching record

Football

References

Year of birth missing
Year of death missing
Central Oklahoma Bronchos football coaches